Ferragosto is a public holiday celebrated on August 15th in all of Italy. It originates from Feriae Augusti, the festival of emperor Augustus, who made the 1st of August a day of rest after weeks of hard work on the agricultural sector. It became a custom for the workers to wish their employers "buon ferragosto" and receive a monetary bonus in return. This became law during the Renaissance throughout the papal states. As the festivity was created for political reasons, the Catholic Church decided to move the festivity to the 15th of August which is the Assumption of Mary allowing them to include this in the festivity. This festivity was also used by Mussolini to give the lower classes the possibility to visit cultural cities or go to the seaside for one to three days, from the 14th of August to the 16th, by creating "holiday trains" with extremely low cost tickets, for this holiday period. Food and board was not included, which is why even today Italians associate packed lunches and barbecues with this day. By metonymy, it is also the summer vacation period around mid-August, which may be a long weekend (ponte di ferragosto) or most of August. Until 2010, 90% of companies, shops and industries closed; however, because closing an entire country's economy for an entire month would result in serious financial impacts and workplace backlogs, most companies now close for about two weeks and require all workers to take mandatory vacation, similar to the practice of workplaces closing between the 25th of December and the first of January.

History
The Feriae Augusti ("Festivals [Holidays] of the Emperor Augustus") were introduced by the emperor  Augustus in 18 BCE. This was an addition to earlier ancient Roman festivals which fell in the same month, such as the Vinalia rustica or the Consualia, which celebrated the harvest and the end of a long period of intense agricultural labor. The Feriae Augusti, in addition to its propaganda function, linked the various August festivals to provide a longer period of rest, called Augustali, which was felt necessary after the hard labour of the previous weeks.

During these celebrations, horse races were organised across the Empire, and beasts of burden (including oxen, donkeys and mules), were released from their work duties and decorated with flowers. Such ancient traditions are still alive today, virtually unchanged in their form and level of participation during the Palio dell'Assunta which takes place on 16 August in  Siena. Indeed, the name "Palio" comes from the pallium, a piece of precious fabric which was the usual prize given to winners of the horse races in ancient Rome.

During the festival, workers greeted their masters, who in return would give them a tip. The custom became so strongly rooted that in the Renaissance it was made compulsory in the Papal States.

The modern Italian name of the holiday comes directly from the Latin name.

According to Richard Overy, author of A History of War in 100 Battles, the Ferragosto Holiday was introduced by C. Caesar Octavian, the future Augustus, after his victory over Mark Antony at the Battle of Actium on 2 September, 31 BCE.

During fascism
The popular tradition of taking a trip during Ferragosto arose under the fascist regime. In the second half of the 1920s, during the mid-August period, the regime organised hundreds of popular trips through the fascist leisure and recreational organisations of various corporations, and via the setting up of the "People's Trains of Ferragosto", which were available at discounted prices.

The initiative gave the opportunity to less well-off social classes to visit Italian cities or to reach seaside and mountain resorts. The offer was limited to 13, 14 and 15 August, and comprised two options: the "One-Day Trip", within a radius of 50-100 km, and the "Three-Day Trip" within a radius of about 100–200 km.

In religion
The Catholic feast of the Assumption of the Blessed Virgin Mary also falls on 15 August, and is a major feast and Holy Day of Obligation.

In music 
 The opera Pagliacci by the Neapolitan composer Ruggero Leoncavallo takes place on the day of Ferragosto ("Oh, che bel sole di mezz'agosto!"; "Per la Vergin pia di mezz'agosto!").
 Notte di ferragosto by Gianni Morandi.
 Ferragosto by Sergio Cammariere.
 Ferragosto Hate by Primo Brown

References

Italian traditions
Public holidays in Italy